The 1988 1. divisjon season, the highest women's football (soccer) league in Norway, began on 30 April 1988 and ended on 9 October 1988.

18 games were played with 3 points given for wins and 1 for draws. Number nine and ten were relegated, while two teams from the 2. divisjon were promoted through a playoff round.

Asker won the league, losing only one game.

League table

Top goalscorers
 22 goals:
  Linda Medalen, Asker
 21 goals:
  Turid Storhaug, Klepp
 16 goals:
  Sissel Grude, Klepp
  Lena Haugen, Setskog
 15 goals:
  Ingunn Ramsfjell, Asker
 14 goals:
  Gunn Nyborg, Asker
  Ellen Scheel, Jardar
 10 goals:
  Ingvild Johansen, Sprint/Jeløy
 9 goals:
  Britt Børve, Bøler
  Elisabeth Grindheim, Sprint/Jeløy
 8 goals:
  Tina Svensson, Asker
  Marit Sigmond, Heimdal
  Linda Raade, Klepp
  Torill Hoch-Nielsen, Sprint/Jeløy
  Tone Haugen, Trondheims-Ørn

Promotion and relegation
 Heimdal and BUL were relegated to the 2. divisjon.
 Skedsmo and Vard were promoted from the 2. divisjon through play-offs.

References
League table
Fixtures
Goalscorers

Norwegian First Division (women) seasons
Top level Norwegian women's football league seasons
women
Nor
Nor